The Cycle préparatoire de Bordeaux (CPBx) is a French Classe préparatoire aux grandes écoles which prepares students to integrate one of the 9 engineering schools in Bordeaux : ENSC, ENSCBP, ENSEIRB-MATMECA, ENSPIMA, ENSTBB, ENSEGID, ENSGTI, Bordeaux Sciences Agro and ESTIA.

Admission figures
 The number of seats in 2012 was 90 for a total of over 1000 applications. The acceptance rate was less than 9% in 2012.
 In 2013, the number of seats available was 80.
 In 2012, 37% of admitted students had received a 'Mention Très Bien' distinction at Baccalauréat.
 A large proportion of students came from a scientific cursus.

Notes and references 

Universities and colleges in France